Task Force Bayonet serves as a name for several military task forces throughout history:

United States
 The deactivated 193rd Infantry Brigade, last stationed in the Panama Canal Zone.
 The 173rd Airborne Brigade Combat Team, currently located in Caserma Ederle, Vicenza, Italy.
Task Force Bayonet was also mentioned in recently leaked Military documents.